Dietmar von Aist (c. 1115 – c. 1171) was a Minnesinger from a baronial family in the Duchy of Austria, whose work is representative of the lyric poetry in the Danube region.

Life
One Dietmar von Aist is mentioned by name from about 1139 onwards in contemporary records from Salzburg, Regensburg and Vienna. The surname probably refers to the Aist River, a left tributary of the Danube below the confluence with the Enns. Since about 1125 the noble family von Aist is evidenced  in the Mühlviertel region (present-day Upper Austria), where today the ruins of the ancestral seat stand on the Aist River.

The Upper Austrian Aistersheim water castle was first mentioned in 1159 together with Freiherr (Baron) Dietmar von Aist, a ministerialis of the Babenberg ruler Henry II of Austria. If he is really identical with the poet is not completely certain on chronological grounds. A certain Ditmarus de Agasta mentioned in further records, who died childless about 1171, is possibly the same as Dietmar von Aist.

Dietmar is also referred to in the 1220s poem Diu Crône by Heinrich von dem Türlin.

Works
A whole series of songs is ascribed to Dietmar, but his authorship can be clearly decided in only a few cases. With those verses which can be attributed to him without any doubt, he belongs in the earliest period of the Minnesang. Dietmar von Aist and his work represent the link between the uncourtly and the courtly forms.

He was one of the first poets to use the refrain and the Tagelied form Wechsel. The themes of his songs are mostly to do with the relationship of men to women (love, parting, partnership), in which connection it is worth noting that some of his poems are written from the female perspective and others from the male. The woman takes a decidedly strong position: for example, she is to  be able to choose her own partner freely - cf the poem Ez stuont ein frouwe alleine - There stood a woman alone (eLib Austria; full text in the original).
The first surviving Tagelied is also by Dietmar: Slâfest du, friedel ziere? (Are you asleep, dearest one?).

Texts

Secondary literature
 Joachim Bumke: Geschichte der deutschen Literatur im hohen Mittelalter, München 1990, pp 85–86 
 Hans Fromm (ed): Der deutsche Minnesang: Aufsätze zu seiner Erforschung, Vol 1, Darmstadt 1961; Vol 2 (Wege der Forschung; volume 608), Darmstadt 1985 
 Rolf Grimminger: Poetik des frühen Minnesangs, (= Münchener Texte und Untersuchungen zur deutschen Literatur des Mittelalters; vol 27), München 1969
 Andreas Hensel: Vom frühen Minnesang zur Lyrik der Hohen Minne: Studien zum Liebesbegriff und zur literarischen Konzeption der Autoren Kürenberger, Dietmar von Aist, Meinloh von Sevelingen, Burggraf von Rietenburg, Friedrich von Hausen und Rudolf von Fenis, Frankfurt am Main 1997 
 Fritz Peter Knapp: Deutschsprachiges Schrifttum, in: Anna M. Drabek (Redaktion), Österreich im Hochmittelalter (907 bis 1246), (= Veröffentlichungen der Kommission für die Geschichte Österreichs/Österreichische Akademie der Wissenschaften; Band 17), Wien 1991, pp 505–526 

 Alfred Romain: Die Lieder Dietmars von Eist, in: Beiträge zur Geschichte der deutschen Sprache und Literatur 37 (1912), pp 349–431, 565
 Günther Schweikle: Minnesang, (= Sammlung Metzler; vol 244), 2., corrected edition Stuttgart 1995  
 Helmut Tervooren: Dietmar von Aist, in: Verfasserlexikon, vol 2, 2nd edition Berlin [and elsewhere] 1980, Spalte 95-98 
 Codex Manesse. Die Miniaturen der Großen Heidelberger Liederhandschrift, edited and explained by Ingo F. Walther, Frankfurt a.M 1989 
 Herbert Zeman (Hg.): Literaturgeschichte Österreichs: von den Anfängen im Mittelalter bis zur Gegenwart, Graz 1996

External links
Codex Manesse
LitLinks
Dietmar von Aist, a discography

12th-century Austrian poets
Austrian male poets
Minnesingers
1110s births
1170s deaths